This is a list of episodes for the American comedy-drama The Game.

Series overview

Episodes

Backdoor pilot (2006)

Season 1 (2006–07)

Season 2 (2007–08)

Season 3 (2008–09)

Season 4 (2011)
 Brittany Daniel and Coby Bell character statuses were demoted to special appearances. Brittany Daniel departs from the series after the eighth episode this season and returns the seventh season.

Season 5 (2012)
On April 12, 2011, it was announced that The Game was renewed for a fifth season, consisting 22 episodes. It was announced on the 2011 BET Awards Pre-show that it will begin in January 2012. This is Tia Mowry-Hardrict’s last season to appear and returns in the series finale.

Season 6 (2013)
 Lauren London and Jay Ellis joining the cast.
 Tia Mowry and Pooch Hall are no longer part of the main cast
 Pooch Hall makes a guest appearance in one episode "The Blueprint"

Season 7 (2014)
 Brittany Daniel returns this season as a recurring cast member beginning with the fourth episode.

Season 8 (2015)

Season 9 (2015)
 Tia Mowry & Pooch Hall returns this season beginning with the tenth and final episode.

References

Lists of American sitcom episodes